Läroverket is a school in central Hudiksvall, Sweden. It's a Swedish 7-9 school, and educates pupils between the ages of 13–15 years.

It was established in 1911.

External links
Website

Gävleborg County